Sidekick primarily refers to:

Sidekick, a close companion who is generally regarded as internship/subordinate to the one he accompanies
Side kick, a martial arts kicking technique

Sidekick may also refer to:

Media related
Sidekick (film), a 2005 independent movie directed by Blake Van de Graaf
Sidekick (TV series), a 2010 cartoon on YTV, Cartoon Network, Disney XD and CBBC
Sidekicks (1974 film), a 1974 TV movie starring Larry Hagman and Louis Gossett, Jr
Sidekicks (1992 film), a 1992 movie starring Chuck Norris and Jonathan Brandis
Quick Step and Side Kick, a 1983 album by Thompson Twins which was released in the USA and Canada under the title Side Kicks
Sidekicks (album), a 1992 album by Tom Fogerty and Randy Oda
Sidekicks (The Naked Brothers Band), a 2008 musical comedy film
Sidekicks (TV series), a 1986 TV series
 "Sidekick", a song by Man Overboard from Real Talk

Other
Sidekick Browser, a web browser program
Borland Sidekick, a computer program
T-Mobile Sidekick, a series of mobile phone and communication devices 
Suzuki Sidekick, a compact SUV
Super Sidekicks, a series of soccer video games for the Neo-Geo, produced by SNK
Dallas Sidekicks (2012), a team in the Professional Arena Soccer League
Dallas Sidekicks (1984–2004), a defunct professional soccer team formerly of the MISL, CISL, and WISL